
The India General Service Medal (1854 IGSM) was a campaign medal approved on 1 March 1854, for issue to officers and men of the British and Indian armies. It was awarded for various minor military campaigns in India and nearby countries, between 1852 and 1895.

In 1852 Lord Dalhousie had suggested a general service medal for smaller Indian campaigns, in order to limit the number of individual medals awarded. 

Indian Army units made up the majority of forces present for nearly all campaigns. While the expeditions covered by the medal included few formal battles, most were undertaken in difficult terrain against determined resistance from local tribesmen.

In 1895, the India Medal was authorised to reflect service in further Indian expeditions, replacing the 1854 General Service Medal.

Appearance
From the Burma 1885–87 clasp, medals in bronze were awarded to authorised native followers who accompanied the troops, such as bearers, sweepers and drivers.

The obverse bears a left facing effigy of Queen Victoria wearing a diadem. Surrounding the head is the inscription VICTORIA REGINA.The reverse depicts Victory crowning a seated warrior with a laurel wreath. In the exergue are lotus flowers and leaves.It was always issued with the recipient's rank, name and unit engraved or impressed on the rim.The medal is suspended by a scrolled bar.

Clasps
A total of 24 clasps were awarded for 23 campaigns with 55 qualifying actions. Those who qualified for a second or subsequent clasp received the new clasp only, to be attached to their existing medal. The medal was never issued without a clasp, with the maximum number known to be awarded to one individual being seven.
The following clasps were issued:

After the first phase of the Second Afghan War in May 1879, it was proposed that the India General Service Medal be issued with clasps for Afghanistan, Ali Musjid and Peiwar Kotal. However then the war recommenced in September 1879, it was decided to award a distinct Afghanistan Medal instead to cover the whole Afghan War.

Notes

Bibliography
 Collett, D.W, Medals Yearbook, (1981)
 Dorling, H. Taprell, Ribbons and Medals, (1956), A. H. Baldwin & Son
 Joslin, Litherland, and Simpkin (eds), British Battles and Medals, (1988), Spink 
 Mayo, John Horsley. Medals and Decorations of the British Army and Navy, Volume 2, (1897). A. Constable & Co
 Mussel, J et al (eds), Medals Yearbook, (2016), Token Publishing, 

British campaign medals
Military of British India